Zanthoxylum simulans, the Chinese-pepper, Chinese prickly-ash or flatspine prickly-ash, is a flowering plant in the family Rutaceae, native to eastern China and Taiwan. It is one of several species of Zanthoxylum from which Sichuan pepper is produced.

It is a spreading shrub or small tree growing to 7 m tall. The leaves are 7–12.5 cm long, pinnate, with 7–11 leaflets, the leaflets 3–5 cm long and 1.5–2 cm broad. There are numerous short (3–6 mm) spines on both the stems and the leaf petioles, and large (several cm) knobs on the branches. The flowers are produced in slender cymes, each flower about 4–5 mm diameter. The 3–4 mm berry has a rough reddish brown shell that splits open to release the black seeds from inside.

Aroma profile
 Myrcene

Notes and references

Flora of Taiwan, volume 3 pages 541, 542 and 543
NC State University fact sheet

simulans
Plants described in 1866